Korvichelma is a village located in Dandepalle mandal of the manchireal district, Telangana state. The village population is approximately 3000. It is located 10 km across the Godavari River. It is connected by road from Luxettipet to Utnoor. It is 25 km away from the Mancherial Railway Station.

Villages in Mancherial district